Sunrise Records and Entertainment Ltd., operating as Sunrise Records (trading in different countries as Les Disquaires Sunrise in Quebec and HMV in the UK), is a Canadian record store chain based in Ancaster, Ontario. Currently owned by Douglas Putman (whose family also runs Everest Toys), it currently operates in nine Canadian provinces. Originally operating with only 9 locations in Ontario, the chain announced a major expansion in February 2017, under which it purchased leases for 70 locations formerly occupied by HMV Canada. The chain runs approximately 85 locations across Canada.

In 2019, Sunrise bought the British HMV chain out of administration.

History
The company was founded in Toronto in 1977, with a location on Yonge Street. It was bought in 1978 by Malcolm and Roy Perlman. For a period, Sunrise was considered one of the five major record store chains in Canada, alongside HMV Canada, Music World, Sam the Record Man, and A&A Records. However, by the 2000s, with the shift towards online music stores and other factors (including the dominance of HMV), most of these smaller chains downsized or shut down. In 2014, Sunrise closed its flagship store in Toronto.

In October 2014, the chain was acquired by Douglas Putman; under Putman, the chain opened new locations, expanding to 9 within Ontario. In January 2017, HMV Canada entered receivership, and announced that it intended to close all stores by the end of April. On February 26, 2017, Sunrise Records announced that it had negotiated to purchase the leases for 70 of HMV's locations from landlords to convert them to Sunrise stores (including major locations such as the Square One Shopping Centre, Promenades Saint-Bruno. Polo Park, West Edmonton Mall, Midtown Plaza Mall in Saskatoon, and Metropolis at Metrotown) and that it would try to retain as many former HMV employees as possible. Putman felt that the bankruptcy of the chain was a major opportunity to expand the regional Sunrise chain into a national brand. He noted that record labels had become concerned by the closure of HMV because they would not have a prominent location to stock their physical product. The company's announcement quoted Universal Music Canada president Jeffrey Remedios, who felt that record stores were still important to fans and artists, and that they were "a community hub where passions are shared, art is explored, and lasting journeys begin." Putman added that "it is really sad to see HMV go. They were a great retailer and they really helped the physical business in Canada."

Of the converted stores, Sunrise planned to stock a larger and broader array of music in comparison to HMV, including larger selections of vinyl records and music by local independent artists, as well as expanded offerings of music and entertainment apparel and merchandise. The new chain has been successful and profitable, with renewed interest in vinyl records having been cited as a factor in its performance (at least half a million vinyl LPs were sold by the chain in 2017).

On February 5, 2019, Sunrise announced that it had acquired HMV Retail Ltd.—the HMV chain's British parent company—from Hilco UK for an undisclosed amount (later revealed to be £883,000). The company had, for a second time, announced its intent to enter administration. Sunrise plans to maintain the chain's operations under the HMV and Fopp banners, and mirror its larger focus on pop culture merchandise and vinyl records. On the day the sale was announced, 27 locations (including its flagship Oxford Street store) were immediately closed, but by late-February, five of the shuttered stores had re-opened, with at least four more to follow. Putman noted that it was "unlikely, but possible" that the HMV brand could theoretically be reintroduced to Canada.

In 2020, Sunrise announced the purchase of FYE from Trans World Entertainment Corporation, which will bring Sunrise to the US.

Locations

Sunrise Records pre-expansion
 Barrie, Ontario – 2
 Brantford, Ontario 
 Etobicoke, Ontario
 London, Ontario
 North Bay, Ontario
 Ottawa, Ontario
 Sault Ste. Marie, Ontario
 Timmins, Ontario
 Waterloo, Ontario

HMV takeover locations

British Columbia

Metropolis at Metrotown – Burnaby
Guildford Town Centre – Surrey
Coquitlam Centre – Coquitlam
Orchard Park – Kelowna
Woodgrove Centre – Nanaimo
Pine Centre Mall – Prince George
Mayfair Shopping Centre – Victoria
Willowbrook Shopping Centre – Langley
Tsawwassen Mills – Delta

Alberta

CrossIron Mills – Rocky View 44
Sunridge Mall – Calgary
Southcentre Mall – Calgary
Marlborough Mall – Calgary
Chinook Centre – Calgary
Market Mall – Calgary
West Edmonton Mall – Edmonton (10,000-square-foot store with performance stage, second floor only, first floor closed and replaced by parent company Toys R Us)
Londonderry Mall – Edmonton
Kingsway Mall – Edmonton
Bonnie Doon Mall – Edmonton
Peter Pond Mall – Fort McMurray
Park Place Mall – Lethbridge
Medicine Hat Mall – Medicine Hat
Bower Place – Red Deer
Prairie Mall – Grande Prairie

Saskatchewan

Southland Mall – Regina
Cornwall Centre – Regina
Lawson Heights Mall – Saskatoon
Midtown Plaza – Saskatoon

Manitoba

Kildonan Place – Winnipeg
Polo Park – Winnipeg
St. Vital Centre – Winnipeg

Ontario

Quinte Mall – Belleville
Cambridge Centre – Cambridge
CF Fairview Park Mall – Kitchener
Sherway Gardens – Etobicoke
Stone Road Mall – Guelph
Limeridge Mall – Hamilton
Square One – Mississauga 
Place d'Orléans – Ottawa
Heritage Place Mall – Owen Sound
Lansdowne Place Mall – Peterborough
Pickering Town Centre – Pickering
Station Mall – Sault Ste. Marie
The Pen Centre – St Catharines
Intercity Shopping Centre – Thunder Bay
Scarborough Town Centre – Scarborough
White Oaks Mall
-London
CF Masonville Place – London
Vaughan Mills – Vaughan
Upper Canada Mall – Newmarket
Devonshire Mall – Windsor
Erin Mills Town Centre – Mississauga
Burlington Mall – Burlington
Bayshore Shopping Centre – Nepean
New Sudbury Centre – Sudbury (Closed)
Bramalea City Centre — Brampton
Quebec

Laurier Québec – Quebec City (Sainte-Foy)
Fleur de Lys centre commercial – Quebec City
Galeries de la Capitale – Quebec City
Les Galeries Chagnon – Lévis
Les Galeries de Hull – Gatineau (Hull)
Les Promenades Gatineau - Gatineau
Promenades St-Bruno – Saint-Bruno-de-Montarville
Place du Royaume – Saguenay
Centre commercial Les Rivières – Trois-Rivières
La Grande place des Bois-Francs – Victoriaville
CF Carrefour Laval – Laval (subsequently closed)
CF Fairview Pointe Claire – Pointe-Claire
Place Versailles – Montreal
Place Rosemère – Rosemère
Les Promenades Drummondville – Drummondville
Carrefour de l'Estrie – Sherbrooke
Carrefour Angrignon – Montreal

New Brunswick

McAllister Place – Saint John
Regent Mall – Fredericton
Champlain Place – Moncton

Nova Scotia

Mic Mac Mall – Dartmouth

Newfoundland & Labrador

Avalon Mall – St. John's

References

External links

Companies based in Hamilton, Ontario
Music retailers of Canada
Retail companies established in 1977
1977 establishments in Ontario